Hamdy is a surname. Notable people with the surname include:

Adam Hamdy (born 1974), British writer, film producer and director best known for his debut comic book limited series The Hunter
Ahmed Hamdy (1929–1973), Egyptian general and sport shooter
Ahmed Hamdy (footballer) (born 1998), Egyptian professional association football midfielder
Al-Sayed Hamdy (born 1984), Egyptian football striker
Emad Hamdy (1909–1984), Egyptian actor
Hamdy Awad (born 1972), Egyptian indoor volleyball player, who played with the Egypt national team at the 2008 Summer Olympics
Hamdy Kandeel, Egyptian T.V and Radio personality
Hassan Hamdy, the 13th and current president of the Egyptian Al-Ahly Sporting Club

See also
Hamdi (disambiguation)
HAMDY mine, Egyptian directional fragmentation mine based on the US Claymore mine and produced by the Maasara Company
Handy (disambiguation)
Hardy (disambiguation)